The 2015–16 Professional U18 Development League was the fourth season of the Professional Development League system.

League 1 

The league was split into two regional divisions – north and south. After playing each team in their own division twice, the league was split into a second league stage consisting of three further divisions. The winning team of Group 1 in the second league stage was the overall champion and qualified for the UEFA Youth League in the 2016–17 season.

First League stage

North Division

South Division

Second league stage

Group 1

Group 2

Group 3

League 2 

League 2, referred to as the Professional Development U18 League, is split into two regional divisions.

Teams will play each team in their own division twice, and each team in the other division once, for a total of 30 games for North division teams, and 29 games each for South division teams.

At the end of the season, the teams finishing in the top two positions of both divisions will meet in the knockout stage to determine the overall league champion.

North Division table

South Division table

Knock-out stage

Semifinals

Final

League 3 

League 3 is run by the Football League under the auspices of the Football League Youth Alliance. 50 teams entered the competition this season.

League stage

North-West Division

North-East Division

South-West Division

South-East Division

See also
 2015–16 Professional U21 Development League
 2015–16 FA Cup
 2015–16 FA Youth Cup
 2015–16 in English football

References

2015–16 in English football leagues
2015-16